Stříbřec is a municipality and village in Jindřichův Hradec District in the South Bohemian Region of the Czech Republic. It has about 400 inhabitants.

Administrative parts
The village of Libořezy and Mníšek are administrative parts of Stříbřec.

Gallery

References

Villages in Jindřichův Hradec District